The Spithead and Nore mutinies were two major mutinies by sailors of the Royal Navy in 1797. They were the first in an increasing series of outbreaks of maritime radicalism in the Atlantic World. Despite their temporal proximity, the mutinies differed in character. The Spithead mutiny was a simple, peaceful, successful strike action to address economic grievances, while the Nore mutiny was a more radical action, articulating political ideals as well, which failed.

The mutinies were extremely concerning for Britain, because at the time the country was at war with Revolutionary France, and the Navy was the main component of the war effort. There were also concerns among the government that the mutinies might be part of wider attempts at revolutionary sedition instigated by societies such as the London Corresponding Society and the United Irishmen.

Spithead

The mutiny at Spithead (an anchorage near Portsmouth) lasted from 16 April to 15 May 1797. Sailors on 16 ships in the Channel Fleet, commanded by Admiral Lord Bridport, protested against the living conditions aboard Royal Navy vessels and demanded a pay rise, better victualling, increased shore leave, and compensation for sickness and injury. On 26 April a supportive mutiny broke out on 15 ships in Plymouth, who sent delegates to Spithead to take part in negotiations.

Seamen's pay rates had been established in 1658, and because of the stability of wages and prices, they were still reasonable as recently as the 1756–1763 Seven Years' War; however, high inflation during the last decades of the 18th century had severely eroded the real value of the pay. In recent years, pay raises had also been granted to the army, militia, and naval officers. At the same time, the practice of coppering the submerged part of hulls, which had started in 1761, meant that British warships no longer had to return to port frequently to have their hulls scraped, and the additional time at sea greatly altered the rhythm and difficulty of seamen's work. The Royal Navy had not made adjustments for any of these changes, and was slow to understand their effects on its crews. Impressment (a common practice during wartime) meant that some of the seamen were onboard ship against their wills. Finally, the new wartime quota system meant that crews had many landsmen from inshore (including some Convicted Criminals sent in lieu of Punishment) who did not mix well with the career seamen, leading to discontented ships' companies.

The mutineers were led by elected delegates and tried to negotiate with the Admiralty for two weeks, focusing their demands on better pay, the abolition of the 14-ounce "purser's pound" (the ship's purser was allowed to keep two ounces of every true pound—16 ounces—of meat as a perquisite), and the removal of a handful of unpopular officers; neither flogging nor impressment was mentioned in the mutineers' demands—even though ending impressment had been one of the motivations for the Mutiny. The mutineers maintained regular naval routine and discipline aboard their ships (mostly with their regular officers), allowed some ships to leave for convoy escort duty or patrols, and promised to suspend the mutiny and go to sea immediately if French ships were spotted heading for English shores.

Because of mistrust, especially over pardons for the mutineers, the negotiations broke down, and minor incidents broke out, with several unpopular officers sent to shore and others treated with signs of deliberate disrespect. When the situation calmed, Admiral Lord Howe intervened to negotiate an agreement that saw a royal pardon for all crews, reassignment of some of the unpopular officers, a pay raise and abolition of the purser's pound. Afterwards, the mutiny was to become nicknamed the "breeze at Spithead".

The Nore

Inspired by the example of their comrades at Spithead, the sailors at the Nore (an anchorage in the Thames Estuary) also mutinied, on 12 May 1797, when the crew of  seized control of the ship. Several other ships in the same location followed this example, though others slipped away and continued to slip away during the mutiny, despite gunfire from the ships that remained (which attempted to use force to hold the mutiny together). The mutineers had been unable to organise easily because the ships were scattered along the Nore (and were not all part of a unified fleet, as at Spithead), but quickly elected delegates for each ship.

Richard Parker was elected "President of the Delegates of the Fleet".  According to him, he was nominated and elected without his knowledge. Parker was a former master's mate who was disrated and court-martialled in December 1793 and re-enlisted in the Navy as a seaman in early 1797, where he came to serve aboard the brig-sloop .  Demands were formulated and on 20 May 1797, a list of eight demands was presented to Admiral Charles Buckner, which mainly involved pardons, increased pay and modification of the Articles of War, eventually expanding to a demand that the King dissolve Parliament and make immediate peace with France. These demands infuriated the Admiralty, which offered nothing except a pardon (and the concessions already made at Spithead) in return for an immediate return to duty.

Captain Sir Erasmus Gower commissioned HMS Neptune (98 guns) in the upper Thames and put together a flotilla of fifty loyal ships to prevent the mutineers moving on the city of London. It was largely fear of this blockade moving down river which made the mutineers reconsider their actions and begin to waver.

The mutineers expanded their initial grievances and blockaded London, preventing merchant vessels from entering the port, and the principals made plans to sail their ships to France, alienating the regular English sailors and losing more and more ships as the mutiny progressed.This gave rise to a fear in the Admiralty that ships still at sea might be taken to France, but that was generally unfounded. When word of the mutiny reached the squadron under Sir John Borlase Warren, cruising off Ushant the crew of HMS Galatea (1794) seized her, confining her captain, Richard Goodwin Keats, but the whole squadron nonetheless followed orders to return to Plymouth. There was seemingly no thought of treason – the men just wanted improvements in their conditions. When they returned to shore Keats was released and once prize money was secured and other matters of pay were settled, they returned to their station. Although the port of Brest was unwatched for some weeks the French missed the opportunity to get to sea.

On 5 June Parker issued an order that merchant ships be allowed to pass the blockade, and only Royal Navy victualling (i.e., supply) ships be detained; the ostensible reason provided in the order was that "the release of the merchant vessels would create a favourable impression on shore", although this decision may actually have been perhaps more due to the complexities involved in such a wide undertaking as interdicting all the merchant traffic on the busy Thames. After the successful resolution of the Spithead mutiny, the government and the Admiralty were not inclined to make further concessions, particularly as they felt some leaders of the Nore mutiny had political aims beyond improving pay and living conditions.

The mutineers were denied food and water, and when Parker hoisted the signal for the ships to sail to France, all of the remaining ships refused to follow.

This was seen as a signal to others to do likewise, and eventually, most ships slipped their anchors and deserted (some under fire from the mutineers), and the mutiny failed. Parker was quickly convicted of treason and piracy and hanged from the yardarm of Sandwich, the vessel where the mutiny had started. In the reprisals which followed, 29 were hanged, 29 were imprisoned, and nine were flogged, while others were sentenced to transportation to Australia. One such was surgeon's mate William Redfern who became a respected surgeon and landowner in New South Wales. The majority of men involved in the mutiny were not punished at all, which was lenient by the standards of the time.

After the Nore mutiny, Royal Navy vessels no longer rang five bells in the last dog watch, as that had been the signal to begin the mutiny.

Alleged role of the United Irishmen
The authorities were more than ready to see in the mutinies the hand not only of English radicals but also, in the large Irish contingent among the sailors, of United Irishmen. Much was made of Valentine Joyce, among the delegates at Spithead, described by Edmund Burke as a "seditious Belfast clubist".

That the Valentine Joyce in question was Irish and a republican has been disputed, and while that "rebellious paper, the Northern Star" (from Belfast) may have circulated as reported among the mutineers, no evidence has emerged of a concerted United Irish plot to subvert the fleet. In Ireland there was talk of seizing British warships as part of a general insurrection, but it was only after the Spithead and Nore mutinies that United Irishmen awoke to "surprising effectiveness" of formulating sedition within the Royal Navy".

HMS Defiance, which had been part of the "floating republic" at Spithead, did see United Irish oaths administered (according to court-martial evidence) in a further mutiny during the Irish rebellion in the early summer of 1798. Eleven of the crew were hanged and ten sentenced to transportation.

Mutinies and discontent following
In September 1797, the crew of  mutinied in the West Indies, killing almost all the officers in revenge for a number of grievances including the throwing into the sea of the bodies of three men who had been killed in falling from the rigging in a desperate scramble to avoid flogging for being last man down on deck. The Hermione was taken by the crew to the Spanish port of La Guaira.

On 27 December, the crew of  murdered their officers and took their ship into a French port in the West Indies. Other mutinies took place off the coast of Ireland and at the Cape of Good Hope and spread to the fleet under Admiral Jervis off the coast of Spain. HMS Defiance, on which order had been restored at Spithead by troops had been where the court martial took evidence of oaths of allegiance to the United Irishmen and sentenced eleven men to hang. In the years following Spithead and the Nore, there was an approximately 50% increase in mutinies among European navies and merchant companies. Scholars have linked it to the radical political ideologies developing in the transnational space of the Atlantic World, as well as to the development of working class consciousness among sailors. Both explanations have been the subject of extensive academic investigation. Political analyses often emphasize the radical discourse and conduct of the Nore mutineers as evidence of their ideological motivation. Class analyses often emphasize the discipline and solely economic grievances of the Spithead mutineers as pointing to "class solidarity". Recent attempts have been made to unify these approaches under a framework of masculine identity, arguing that different interpretations of what it meant to be a man to the sailors were the cause of the political/ideological/economic differences between the two mutinies.

In the arts
 The father of the protagonist in Frederick Marryat's The King's Own (1830) was hanged for his part in the Nore mutiny.
 Herman Melville's novel Billy Budd (1891, published 1924), and the 1951 opera based on it by Benjamin Britten, are set immediately after the main mutinies.
 The Floating Republic – An account of the Mutinies at Spithead and The Nore in 1797, by G. E. Manwaring and Bonamy Dobrée published by Frank Cass & Co. 1935 is a history of these mutinies. In 1982, BBC Radio 4's Saturday Night Theatre broadcast a dramatised account of the book called The Floating Republic.
 The 1962 film H.M.S. Defiant (released in the U.S. as Damn the Defiant!) and the 1958 novel Mutiny by Frank Tilsley is a fictional account of a ship's crew undertaking a mutiny at sea at the time of the Spithead mutiny, the result of which is part of the plot.
 Ramage and the Freebooters (1969) by British novelist Dudley Pope begins when Lieutenant Ramage is given command of a ship anchored at Spithead during the Mutiny, and must convince the crew to sail so that he may carry out his orders.
 The Men They Couldn't Hang, an English folk-punk group, commemorated the executed leaders of the mutiny in the ballad "The Colours" (1988).
 In William Kinsolving's 1996 novel Mister Christian, Fletcher Christian returns from the South Seas and witnesses the Nore mutiny.
 Much of the Dewey Lambdin 2000 novel A King's Captain is set during the Nore Mutiny as seen by the protagonist, Alan Lewrie.
 Mutiny (2004) by Julian Stockwin is a fictional account of the Nore mutiny.

Notes

References

Further reading

  – 1st pub, New York: Harcourt, Brace and Company 1935

External links
 Research guide B8: The Spithead and Nore mutinies of 1797 (from the Royal Museums Greenwich)
 https://www.americanantiquarian.org/thomasballads/items/show/148 Lines composed on the death of Parker, who was hung at the yard arm for mutiny in England.

Royal Navy mutinies
1797 in Great Britain
Conflicts in 1797
Military history of Great Britain
18th-century history of the Royal Navy
Atlantic Revolutions